Bill Lacey may refer to:

Bill Lacey (American football) (born 1971), college football coach
Bill Lacey (footballer) (1889–1969), Irish footballer
William Lacey (born 1973), British conductor

See also
William Lacy (disambiguation)